"Young Emotions" is a song written by Jerry Livingston and Mack David and performed by Ricky Nelson. The song reached #12 on the Billboard Hot 100, #28 on the R&B chart, and #48 in the UK in 1960.  The single's B-side, "Right by My Side", reached #59 on the Billboard Hot 100.

The song is ranked #85 on Billboard magazine's Top 100 songs of 1960.

References

1960 songs
1960 singles
Songs written by Jerry Livingston
Songs written by Mack David
Ricky Nelson songs
Imperial Records singles